Tamenglong (Vidhan Sabha constituency) is one of the 60 Vidhan Sabha constituencies in the Indian state of Manipur.

It is part of Tamenglong district and is reserved for candidates belonging to the Scheduled Tribes.

Members of Assembly 
1967: Kakhangai, Independent
1972: Tp Kiulengpou, Independent
1974: T. P. Kiulengpou, Manipur Hills Union
1980: K. Huriang, Independent
1981: J.Panmei, Independent
1984: Jangamlung Panmei, Indian National Congress
1990: Daisin Pamei, Janata Dal
1995: Samuel, Samta Party
2000: Samuel Jendai, Manipur State Congress Party
2002: Samuel Jendai, Federal Party of Manipur
2007: Khangthuanang Panmei, Independent
2012: Janghemlung Panmei, Manipur State Congress Party

Elections results

2017

See also
 Tamenglong district
Manipur Legislative Assembly
List of constituencies of Manipur Legislative Assembly

References

External links
 

Assembly constituencies of Manipur
Tamenglong district